The Southern Style Tour was a headlining concert tour by American singer Darius Rucker, it supported his fifth studio album Southern Style (2015). It began on May 14, 2015, in Holmdel, New Jersey and finished on November 20, 2015, in Toledo, Ohio. The tour placed eighty-second on Pollstar's Year End Top 200 North American Tours of 2015, and grossed $14 million.

Background
In January 2015, while appearing on The Tonight Show Starring Jimmy Fallon, Rucker announced the tour and his new album. The tour will be a part of Live Nation's Country Megaticket. Supporting Rucker on the first leg is, Brett Eldredge, Brothers Osborne, A Thousand Horses, and Cassadee Pope. The second leg was announced in July 2015, A Thousand Horses will continue to open up for Rucker with the addition of David Nail.

Setlist
North America Leg 1
"Lighter Up"
"This"
"Good for a Good Time"
"Radio"
"Southern Style"
"Time" (Hootie & the Blowfish song)
"All I Want"
"Don't Think I Don't Think About It"
"Back When"
"No Diggity" (Blackstreet, Dr. Dre & Queen Pen cover)
"It Won't Be Like This for Long"
"History in the Making"
"Alright"
"Only Wanna Be With You" (Hootie & the Blowfish song; performed with Brett Eldredge, Brothers Osborne & A Thousand Horses)
"East Bound and Down" (Jerry Reed cover)
"Let Her Cry" (Hootie & the Blowfish song)
"Come Back Song"
"Hold My Hand" (Hootie & the Blowfish song)
"Homegrown Honey"
Encore
"So I Sang"
"Wagon Wheel" (Old Crow Medicine Show cover)

Tour dates

Festivals and other miscellaneous performances
 This concert is a part of Froggy Fest 2015
 This concert is a part of 92.5 WXTU's 31st Anniversary Show
 This concert is a part of 99.5 WYCD's Downtown Hoedown
 This concert is a part of Musikfest

References

2015 concert tours
 Concert tours of the United States
Darius Rucker concert tours